The East Devon Alliance, also known as the Independent East Devon Alliance, was registered as a political party in East Devon at the Electoral Commission in 2015. It provides a protective umbrella for non-national party Independent candidates in local elections. It has no whip.

It had its origins in 2013  as a community activist and pressure group opposed to large-scale unsustainable development providing poor quality homes with very few affordables. Under electoral law it was obliged to register as a political party in 2015 when it won 10 of the 59 seats in the 2015 East Devon District Council election. In May 2015, the voters of East Devon elected 10 EDA district councillors and 5 independents. In 2017, EDA elected its first Devon County Councillor, former Labour Party member Martin Shaw, representing Seaton and Colyton. Martin Shaw is no longer a Devon County Councillor for Seaton and Colyton following the 2021 election when Marcus Hartnell (Conservative) was elected.

It campaigns strongly to save community beds in hospitals, for reform in local governance, for affordable homes and a developing green agenda

In May 2019, the party increased its number of district councillors to 11.

References

2013 establishments in the United Kingdom
Locally based political parties in England
Political parties established in 2015
Politics of Devon